Lübben (Spreewald) is a town of 14,000 people, capital of the Dahme-Spreewald district in the Lower Lusatia region of Brandenburg, Germany.

Administrative structure
Districts of the town are:
 Lübben Stadt (Lower Sorbian: Lubin město)
 Hartmannsdorf (Hartmanojce)
 Lubolz (Lubolc)
 Groß Lubolz (Wjelike Lubolce)
 Klein Lubolz (Małe Lubolce)
 Neuendorf (Nowa Wjas)
 Radensdorf (Radom; Radowašojce)
 Steinkirchen (Kamjena)
 Treppendorf (Ranchow)

History

The castle of Lubin in the March of Lusatia was first mentioned in an 1150 register of Nienburg Abbey and had received town privileges according to Magdeburg law by 1220. From 1301 the town in the centre of the Spreewald floodplain was in the possession of the monks of Dobrilugk Abbey, who sold it to Duke Rudolph I of Saxe-Wittenberg in 1329. After several conflicts with the Wittelsbach margraves of Brandenburg the March of Lusatia was finally acquired by Emperor Charles IV of Luxembourg in 1367 who incorporated Lübben into the Kingdom of Bohemia. In the 15th century Lübben became the seat of the Bohemian Vogt administrator and the provincial diet (Landtag) of Lower Lusatia.

In 1526 the House of Habsburg inherited the Bohemian kingdom including Lusatia, which in 1623 Ferdinand II of Habsburg had to give in pawn to Elector John George I of Saxony. The Saxon Electorate finally acquired Lübben by signing the 1635 Peace of Prague. After the Napoleonic Wars it again fell to the Prussian province of Brandenburg by the final act of the 1815 Congress of Vienna.

During World War II, a prisoner of war camp, Oflag III-C, was located in Lubben and hosted French officers. Lübben was taken by Soviet troops of the 3rd Guards Army on 27 April 1945.

Demography

Politics

Seats in the municipal assembly (Stadtverordnetenversammlung) as of 2008 elections:
 Christian Democratic Union: 7
 Social Democratic Party of Germany: 5
 The Left: 5
 PRO Lübben (Independent): 4
 Free Democratic Party: 1
Lübben is twinned with Wolsztyn in Poland and Neunkirchen, Saarland in Germany.

Places of interest
 Spreewald biosphere reserve
 Lübben Castle, on medieval foundations, rebuilt in the 17th century under the rule of Duke Christian I of Saxe-Merseburg
 Neuhaus Manor in Steinkirchen, built in 1801, former residence of author Christoph Ernst von Houwald from 1822 on
 Romanesque St Pancras fieldstone church in Steinkirchen built in the early 13th century, one of the oldest preserved churches in Lower Lusatia
 Paul Gerhardt Church from the 16th century, where Paul Gerhardt preached from 1669 on
 Roman Catholic Trinity Church, built in 1862

Notable people

Born in Lübben
 Hans Peter Bull (born 1936), German constitutional lawyer and jurist
 Karin Büttner-Janz (born 1952 in Hartmannsdorf), German Olympic medal winner in artistic gymnastics and habilitated doctor
 Henry Eugene Fritz (1875–1956), American painter
 Hans Walter Gruhle (1880–1958), German psychiatrist
 Benno Hann von Weyhern (1808–1890), Prussian General of the Cavalry
 Louis Klopsch (1852–1910), American author and editor of the Christian Herald
 Sylvio Kroll (born 1965), German Olympic medal winner in artistic gymnastics
 Kornelia Kunisch (born 1959), German handball player, 1980 olympic bronze medal with the East German team
 Christian Lillinger (born 1984), German musician and composer
 Karl Otto von Manteuffel (1806-1879), German politician, prussian agriculture minister
 Otto Theodor von Manteuffel (1805–1882), German politician, Minister-President of Prussia
 Rudolf Marloth (1855–1931), South African botanist, pharmacist and analytical chemist
 Ella Mensch (1859–1935), German writer, journalist, teacher, feminist and editor
 Richard Constantin Noschke (1867–1945), diary of his World War I Alexandra Palace internment sufferings in Imperial War Museum, London.
 Thorsten Rund (born 1976), German cyclist
 Carl Siegemund Schönebeck (1758–1806), German composer and cellist
 Lavinia Schulz (1896–1924), German dancer and actress
 Ingo Spelly (born 1966), East German-German sprint canoer, Olympic champion

Related to Lübben
 Paul Gerhardt (1607–1676), German hymn writer, 1668 till his death archdeacon of Lübben
 Renate Holm (1931–2022), German-Austrian film actress and operatic soprano, school in Lübben
 Christoph Ernst von Houwald (1778–1845), German dramatist and author, died at Neuhaus
 Götz von Houwald (1913–2001), German diplomat, historian and ethnographer, completed his secondary education in Lübben
 Albert Naumann (1875–1952), German fencer, died in Lübben
 Jens Riewa (born 1963), German television presenter and broadcast news analyst for the Tagesschau, grew up in Lübben
 Immanuel Johann Gerhard Scheller (1735–1803), German classical philologist and lexicographer, teacher in Lübben
 Daniel Ziebig (born 1983), German footballer, used to live in Lübben
 We Butter the Bread with Butter, German deathcore band formed in 2007

References

External links

 Lübben (Spreewald) – official website
 Old postcards of Lübben
 

Localities in Dahme-Spreewald